Creeveroe is a townland in County Armagh, Northern Ireland. It is about three-and-a-half miles west of Armagh, and is situated within the civil parish of Eglish. The townland derives its name from the Irish an Chraobh Rua, referring to the Red Branch, one of the three royal houses of Conchobar mac Nessa, legendary king of the Ulaid, at nearby Navan Fort.

Creeveroe neighbours the townland of Ballyrea, the location of Ballyrea Orange Hall, and the base of Ballyrea Boyne Defenders flute band. The Australian poet Victor James William Patrick Daley was born at Creeveroe and used it as his pen name.

There is also a townland called Creeveroe in County Clare, Republic of Ireland.
There is also a townland called creeveroe in North East Co Galway.

References

Townlands of County Armagh